Abdoulaye Diouf Sarr (born 20th-century) is a Senegalese politician.

Political career 
He was Minister of Health until he was sacked by President Macky Sall on 26 May 2022 following a hospital fire that killed 11 babies in the city of Tivaouane. He was replaced by Marie Khemesse Ngom Ndiaye.

See also 
 Diouf family

References

Living people
20th-century births
Alliance for the Republic (Senegal) politicians
Transport ministers of Senegal
Health ministers of Senegal
21st-century Senegalese politicians
Year of birth missing (living people)